Amherst is a town in Hillsborough County in the state of New Hampshire, United States. The population was 11,753 at the 2020 census. Amherst is home to Ponemah Bog Wildlife Sanctuary, Hodgman State Forest, the Joe English Reservation and Baboosic Lake.

The village of Amherst, where 697 people lived at the 2020 census, is defined as the Amherst census-designated place and is listed on the National Register of Historic Places as Amherst Village Historic District.

History

Like many towns in New England, Amherst was founded via a land grant issued to members of the colonial militia; the land grant which led to the town's foundation was issued in 1728 to veterans of King Philip's War. A colonial settlement was established at the land grant's location five years later in 1733, being initially named "Narragansett Number 3" and later "Souhegan Number 3". In 1741, the settlement's inhabitants established a Congregational church and hired a minister to preach in the settlement. On January 18, 1760, the settlement was chartered by the governor of New Hampshire Benning Wentworth, who renamed it after General Jeffery Amherst, who served as Commander-in-Chief, North America during the French and Indian War. Wentworth chartered Amherst as part of a wave of land grants he issued during the mid-18th century.

In 1770, Amherst became the county seat of Hillsborough County, due largely to its location on the county's major east-west road. It continued to prosper through the Revolutionary War and afterwards. In 1790, the southwestern section broke off and became the town of Milford, and in 1803, the northwest section departed to become Mont Vernon. The development of water-powered mills allowed Milford to grow at Amherst's expense, and the county seat was moved to Milford in 1866.

The town population remained relatively stagnant until after World War II, when Amherst and many surrounding towns saw an influx of newcomers as the town became part of the Greater Boston region.

Franklin Pierce, who later become the 14th President of the United States studied under Judge Edmund Parker in Amherst. He wed Jane Means Appleton, the daughter of a former president of Bowdoin College, in a house on the town green.

The Nashua and Wilton Railroad passed through Amherst.

Government and politics 

Amherst is located in New Hampshire's 2nd congressional district, represented by Democrat Ann McLane Kuster (D-Hopkinton). The town is located in New Hampshire's 11th State Senate district, represented by Republican Gary L. Daniels (R-Milford). 

In the New Hampshire House of Representatives, Amherst has two districts covering the town. Hillsborough 22 is a district with three seats covering just the town of Amherst; it is currently represented by three Democrats: Tony Labranche, Megan Murray, and Dan Veilleux. Amherst also shares Hillsborough 41, a single-member district, with the neighboring town of Bedford; it is represented by Republican Laurie Sanborn (R-Bedford).

Geography
The entire town is part of the Merrimack River watershed. The Souhegan River, an east-flowing tributary of the Merrimack, passes through the southern part of the town, and the Souhegan's tributary Beaver Brook drains the central part of town and passes through the main village. Baboosic Lake is farther north, along the eastern border of the town and is fed by Joe English Brook. The lake drains to the east into Baboosic Brook, a tributary of the Merrimack. Pulpit Brook, which drains the northeast corner of the town, flows into Baboosic Brook as well. Witches Brook flows through the southernmost part of the town and is a tributary of Pennichuck Brook, yet another tributary of the Merrimack.

New Hampshire Route 101 crosses the town, leading northeast into Bedford and then to Manchester, and southwest into Milford. A spur, New Hampshire Route 101A, crosses the southern part of Amherst, connecting Milford to the west with Nashua to the southeast. New Hampshire Route 122 begins at Amherst village and leads south into Hollis.

Adjacent municipalities 
 Bedford, New Hampshire (northeast)
 Merrimack, New Hampshire (east)
 Hollis, New Hampshire (south)
 Milford, New Hampshire (southwest)
 Mont Vernon, New Hampshire (west)
 New Boston, New Hampshire (northwest)

Demographics

As of the census of 2010, there were 11,201 people, 4,063 households, and 3,322 families residing in the town. The population density was 327.5 people per square mile (126.5/km). There were 4,280 housing units at an average density of 125.1 per square mile (48.4/km). The racial makeup of the town was 95.8% White, 0.5% African American, 0.1% Native American, 1.7% Asian, 0.04% Pacific Islander, 0.4% some other race, and 1.5% from two or more races. Hispanic or Latino of any race were 1.9% of the population.

There were 4,063 households, out of which 37.7% had children under the age of 18 living with them, 72.2% were headed by married couples living together, 6.7% had a female householder with no husband present, and 18.2% were non-families. 14.5% of all households were made up of individuals, and 6.0% were someone living alone who was 65 years of age or older. The average household size was 2.76, and the average family size was 3.06.

In the town, the age distribution of the population was 26.0% under the age of 18, 5.6% from 18 to 24, 19.4% from 25 to 44, 36.5% from 45 to 64, and 12.5% who were 65 years of age or older. The median age was 44.4 years. For every 100 females, there were 97.0 males. For every 100 females age 18 and over, there were 96.5 males.

For the period 2011-2015, the estimated median annual income for a household in the town was $121,349, and the median income for a family was $130,278. Male full-time workers had a median income of $102,869, versus $51,473 for females. The per capita income for the town was $49,190. About 1.8% of families and 2.9% of the population were below the poverty line, including 3.4% of those under age 18 and 2.6% of those age 65 or over.

Public education
Amherst is home to Clark and Wilkins elementary schools, Amherst Middle School and Souhegan High School. The elementary schools handle children from Amherst only. Seventh and eighth graders from neighboring Mont Vernon attend the middle school on a tuition basis, while Amherst and Mont Vernon jointly own Souhegan High School, which serves both towns.

Notable people 

 Charles G. Atherton (1804–1853), U.S. congressman and senator
 Charles Humphrey Atherton (1773–1853), U.S. congressman
 Courtney Banghart (born 1978), head women's basketball coach at Princeton University. (Souhegan High School, 1995)
 John S. Barry (1802–1870), fourth and eighth Governor of Michigan 
 Samuel Bell (1770–1850), 14th Governor of New Hampshire
 Moses Billings (1809–1884), portrait artist
 Ainsworth Blunt (1800–1865), missionary to the Cherokee in Georgia
 Hubert Buchanan (born 1941), prisoner of war in Vietnam
 Clifton Clagett (1762–1829), U.S. congressman
 Jonathan Fisk (1778–1832), U.S. congressman from New York
 Horace Greeley (1811–1872), editor, founder of the Liberal Republican Party
 Jon "maddog" Hall (born 1950), programmer, computer scientist, free software advocate
 Joanne Head (1930–2021), member of the New Hampshire House of Representatives
 Neal Huntington (born 1969), General Manager of the Pittsburgh Pirates (2007–present)
Tony Labranche (born 2001), youngest member of the New Hampshire House of Representatives as of 2021
 Moses Nichols (1740–1790), physician, Revolutionary War era soldier and statesman
 Jane Means (Appleton) Pierce (1806–1863), first lady, wife of Franklin Pierce
 Frank Selee (1859–1909), manager for the Boston Beaneaters and Chicago Orphans, member of Baseball Hall of Fame
 Jason Sorens (born 1976), founder of the Free State Project

References

Further reading
 Hayward's New England Gazetteer (1839)
 Statistics and Gazetteer of New-Hampshire (1875)

External links

 
 Amherst Historical Society
 Amherst Town Library
 New Hampshire Economic and Labor Market Information Bureau Profile
 Peabody Mill Environmental Center

 
Towns in Hillsborough County, New Hampshire
Populated places established in 1760
Towns in New Hampshire